The Statue of Peace (Pyeonghwaui sonyeosang; , Heiwano shōjo-zō), often shortened to Sonyeosang in Korean or Shōjo-zō in Japanese (literally "statue of girl") and sometimes called the , is a symbol of the victims of sexual slavery, known euphemistically as comfort women, by the Japanese military during World War II (specifically, the period from the beginning of the Second Sino-Japanese War until the end of the Pacific War). The Statue of Peace was first erected in Seoul to urge the Japanese government to apologize to and honour the victims. However, it has since become a site of representational battles among different parties.

History
The Wednesday demonstration started in 1992 and, nearly 20 years later, the idea for the Statue of Peace was proposed by the Korean Council for Women Drafted for Military Sexual Slavery by Japan. More specifically, the council proposed that a memorial stone be erected in front of the Embassy of Japan in Seoul to commemorate the pain of comfort women as the victims of sexual slavery by the Japanese imperial military. This proposal was realized on 14 December 2011, when the bronze statue was installed in front of the embassy. The Statue of Peace was designed by the couple Kim Seo-kyung and Kim Eun-sung. It depicts a girl dressed in a chima jeogori (a modified form of hanbok in the late-19th to early-20th century), with small hands and short hair, sitting and staring at the Embassy of Japan in central Seoul.

Japan has repeatedly demanded that the statue be removed, but Seoul and especially the victims have rejected such demands, consistently arguing that the Japanese government has never officially admitted the direct involvement of its military in the comfort women issue. The Japanese government did in fact admit to this in 1992.

Until now in South Korea, since the Statue of Peace has not been designated as a public sculpture, it has been difficult to prevent the statue from being damaged. On 30 June 2017, the civil congress of the city of Busan created a legal foundation to protect the statue by passing the relevant ordinance. For this reason, it has become difficult to move or demolish the monument.

Diplomatic incident with Japan
In 2015, South Korea and Japan reached an agreement to settle the comfort women issue. As a part of this agreement, South Korea acknowledged the fact that Japan was concerned about the statue in front of the Embassy of Japan in Seoul and committed to solve the issue in an appropriate manner. In December 2015, Japan stated that it would not pay ¥1 billion as compensation unless the Statue of Peace was removed from its location in Seoul since South Korea agreed to address the statue issue yet failed to do so. Afterward, a second statue was erected in Busan. Japan then recalled two diplomats from South Korea and halted high-level talks. South Korea also terminated the 2015 agreement on 21 November 2018 and effectively shut down the Japanese-funded comfort women foundation that was set up to pay the agreed settlement. Japan maintains that the agreement is still legally binding and therefore, the placement of the statue is illegal.

Local opposition to the Statue of Peace in the United States
In July 2021, the city council in Aurora, Colorado voted against a proposal for a Statue of Peace to be installed on public property. After the vote, city staff wrote "The memorials have attracted a wide range of community response including peaceful and antagonistic free speech events, vandalism, Asian hate, and legal action requesting removal". The letter also states, "The City of Aurora is the most culturally diverse community in Colorado with many Asian citizens. The memorial represents an unresolved dispute between South Korea and Japan. Based on this information the Parks, Recreation, and Open Space Department believes the memorial placement on city-owned property is not a compatible use".

Other statues inspired by the Statue of Peace
The issue of comfort women and the Statue of Peace has inspired other such monuments to be built in Seoul and in cities around the world with sizeable Korean populations. The Column of Strength, a comfort women statue in San Francisco, is the first in a major U.S. city. After the statue was revealed, Osaka, Japan ended its decades-long sister-city relationship.  

In May 2012, officials in Koreatown, Palisades Park, New Jersey, rejected requests by two diplomatic delegations from Japan to remove a small monument from a public park, a brass plaque on a block of stone, dedicated in 2010 to the memory of the comfort women. Days later, a South Korean delegation endorsed the borough's decision. However, in neighboring Koreatown, Fort Lee, various Korean American groups could not reach a consensus on the design and wording for such a monument as of early April 2013. In October 2012, a similar memorial was announced in nearby Hackensack, New Jersey, to be raised behind the Bergen County Courthouse, alongside memorials to the Holocaust, the Great Irish Famine, Slavery in the United States, and the Armenian genocide, and it was unveiled in March 2013.

See also
 Peace Monument of Glendale
 Japan–Korea disputes
 Japanese war crimes

References

External links

Works about comfort women
Monuments and memorials in South Korea
Monuments and memorials to women
`